A worm's-eye view is a view of an object from below, as though the observer were a worm; the opposite of a bird's-eye view.

It can be used to look up to something to make an object look tall, strong, and mighty while the viewer feels childlike or powerless.

A worm's eye view commonly uses three-point perspective, with one vanishing point on top, one on the left, and one on the right.

See also 
Plans (drawings)

References

Methods of representation
Technical drawing
Cartography